Iain mac Mhurchaidh, alias John MacRae (died ca. 1780), was a Scotland-born  Bard from Kintail, a member of Clan Macrae, and an early immigrant to the Colony of North Carolina. MacRae has been termed one of the "earliest Scottish Gaelic poets in North America about whom we know anything."

MacRae fought as a Loyalist soldier during the American Revolution at the Battle of Moore's Creek Bridge and at the Battle of King's Mountain. His many war poems which celebrate the British cause during the Revolutionary War are an important part of Scottish Gaelic literature and remain popular among speakers of Canadian Gaelic.

According to Michael Newton, MacRae the war poet so inspired the Gaels settled along the Cape Fear River to rise up and fight for King George III that American Patriots, "treated him with great severity."

Early life
Iain mac Mhurchaidh was born at Lianag a’ Chùl Doire in Kintail. He was the son of Murdo, who was the son of Farquhar, who was the fourth son of Alasdair MacRae, the 8th Chief of Clan Macrae of Inverinate. 

Through their mutual descent from Alasdair MacRae, 8th of Inverinate, Iain mac Mhurchaidh was the first cousin once removed of fellow Gaelic poet Donnchadh MacRae, 9th of Inverinate, the scribe of the Fernaig manuscript.

The MacRaes of Inverinate were well-known for their loyalty to the Chief of Clan MacKenzie. In view of their loyal and effective service to the Mackenzie Chiefs, Clan Macrae of Kintail was known as Clan Mackenzie's "shirt of mail."

Despite the sitting Chief's decision to side with the House of Hanover during the Jacobite rising of 1745, however, Clan Macrae was divided. A number of Macraes are known to have fought for Prince Charles Edward Stuart under George Mackenzie, 3rd Earl of Cromartie. Others joined the government's Independent Highland Companies under Captain Colin Mackenzie  In June 1746 the Mackenzie Company at Shiramore in Badenoch had over sixty Macraes, including an Ensign John MacRae.

As a member of the minor Scottish nobility, MacRae lived a very privileged life compared to the vast majority of his fellow Gaels following the Battle of Culloden in 1746. MacRae served Kenneth Mackenzie, 1st Earl of Seaforth and Chief of Clan MacKenzie, as a ground-officer, deer stalker, and forester throughout Kintail and Lochalsh. This was a very comfortable and well-paid position. Furthermore, MacRae's wit made him so popular among both the Scottish nobility and commons that no formal dress ball or village ceilidh was considered complete without his presence.

Decision to emigrate
Around 1773, MacRae received a letter encouraging him to emigrate from Rev.  Iain Beutan, a native of Glenelg and minister of the Barbeque Presbyterian Church in would later become Harnett County, in the Colony of North Carolina. Although it is not known what Rev. Beutan's letter said, it is considered likely by literary scholars that he mentioned the abundance of wild game in the New World.

In Scottish culture, hunting was a traditional pastime for both nobles and warriors and eating fish or seafood was considered a sign a low birth or status. By this time, however, hunting was being increasingly treated as poaching by the Anglo-Scottish landlords. Iain mac Mhurchaidh had already composed a poem complaining that his hunting rights were being restricted and, for this and many other reasons, he decided on taking the minister's advice and emigrating to the Colony of North Carolina.

As news spread of Iain Mac Mhuirchaidh's plans, his friends and relations were reportedly very distressed. Three noblemen with massive holdings in Ross-shire lavishly entertained MacRae at dinner and offered him any farm on their estates he desired, but to no avail. 

MacRae, however, had no intention of going alone and composed many Gaelic poems and songs in which he urged his friends and relations to join him. In those poems, like many other Gaelic poets of the era who favored voluntary emigration, MacRae complained that warriors were no longer valued and that greed had come to mean more to the Chiefs and the Tacksmen than family or clan ties. Iain mac Mhurchaidh always concluded his poems by arguing that the Gaels would do well to emigrate to the New World and abandon such a corrupted nobility.

After making the final arrangements for his departure, Iain hosted the Captain of the emigrant ship to dinner at his house. According to an 1882 article in The Celtic Monthly, "His guest, seeing his table better provided with good things than was the ordinary lot of common emigrants, enquired of his host if he was always able to have such a spread for himself. Being answered in the affirmative, the captain told the bard that he would not be able to have such in America and, at the same time, advised him to stay at home. His wife and many of his friends he was leaving behind him also urged him to do this. Being undecided as to what in the circumstances, he should do, his friend Ardintoul pointed out to him that, if he turned home after all that he had said, sang, and done, he would live despised ever after as a weak-minded coward. The thought of being held dishonoured and a coward decided the matter."

Revolutionary War Poet
Iain mac Mhuirchaidh arrived in the Colony of North Carolina in 1774. By 1775, he had amassed enough wealth to purchase 150 acres along McLendons Creek, in what is now Moore County, North Carolina.

Following his emigration, Iain mac Mhuirchaidh is believed by some scholars to have composed the Gaelic lullaby Dèan cadalan sàmhach, a chuilean a rùin ("Go to sleep peacefully, little beloved one").

Marcus Tanner has called Iain mac Mhurchaidh's arrival in the New World, "a real case of bad timing", as he, "had hardly gotten himself established before he was fighting his fellow Americans."

At the beginning of the American Revolution, Brigadier General Donald MacDonald issued an appeal to all Scottish Gaels in the Colony to take up arms on behalf of the Loyalist cause. In what was later dubbed, "The Insurrection of Clan Donald," Iain mac Mhuirchaidh was one of the first North Carolina Gaels to enlist. 

On February 27, 1776, Iain mac Mhuirchaidh fought on the Loyalist side during the Battle of Moore's Creek Bridge and survived to be taken prisoner. His son, Murdo, fought alongside him at the same battle and was mortally wounded.

While imprisoned with the battle's other Loyalist leaders in Philadelphia and feeling a deep sense of regret for having emigrated to America, he composed the song Tha mi sgìth dhe'n fhòghairt seo ("I am weary of this exile").

Iain mac Mhuirchaidh must have been released or escaped because, according to tradition, he fought again as a Loyalist under the command of Major Patrick Ferguson at the Battle of King's Mountain on October 7, 1780. 

Although this battle has traditionally, "been characterized as a confrontation between Loyalist Highlanders and Scotch-Irish revolutionaries", there were in reality Gaelic-speakers fighting on both sides. According to one source, Iain mac Mhuirchaidh, in a revival of, "the diplomatic immunity of the ancient Celtic bards", walked between the opposing armies during the battle and, in an attempt to convert his fellow Gaels among the Patriot militia and the Overmountain Men, he sang the song, Nam faighte làmh-an-uachdar air luchd nan còta ruadha ("Even if the upper hand were gained against the Redcoats"). 

In the poem, Iain mac Mhurchaidh called the American Revolution against King George every bit as unnatural as disrespect against one's earthly or heavenly father. He also threatened that Patriots who did not submit to the British Monarchy would be treated like both real and suspected Jacobites had been treated in the aftermath of the Battle of Culloden, which is still referred to in the Highlands and Islands as Bliadhna nan Creach ("The Year of the Pillaging").  

Like many other Loyalists, he paid a very heavy price for his Monarchist beliefs. In 1780, the North Carolina General Assembly taxed his property in Moore County at three times its value.

Death
Iain mac Mhuirchaidh is believed to have died in 1780; the same year as the Battle of King's Mountain. According to one source, he died in captivity. Other historians believe that he was "probably killed by the American Patriots." According to one tradition, Iain Mac Mhurchaidh, "suffered an excruciating death", at Patriot hands.

Legacy
Following the end of the war, Moore County and many other regions of the new United States which had been mainly settled by Scottish Gaels, were almost depopulated, as Gaelic-speaking Loyalists fled northward towards what remained of British North America.

Among these so-called "United Empire Loyalist" refugees was Iain mac Mhurchaidh's close friend Rev. Iain Beutan (John Bethune), formerly of the Barbeque Presbyterian Church in Harnett County, North Carolina. Rev. Beutan was similarly taken prisoner following the Battle of Moore's Creek Bridge. After being released in a prisoner exchange and serving as military chaplain to the 84th Regiment of Foot, Rev. Bethune ministered to his fellow Gaels at Montreal and Williamstown, in the Canadian Gaelic-speaking settlement of Glengarry County, Ontario, and is credited with organizing the first two Presbyterian congregations in Canada, where his many descendants include the Academy Award-winning actor Christopher Plummer.

According to Marcus Tanner, Iain Mac Mhurchaidh's, "poems were brought back to Scotland years later by others who had learned them." A fellow Loyalist Gael also named John MacRae, who was known in Gaelic as Iain mac a’ Ghobha, who lost his arm in combat during the American Revolution, is particularly credited with memorizing Iain mac Mhurchaidh's poems and bringing them back to his native district of Kintail, in Scotland.

According to Marcus Tanner, though, despite the post-Revolutionary War redirection of emigration by the Gaels from Scotland to Canada, a large Gàidhealtachd community continued to exist in North Carolina, "until it was well and truly disrupted", by the American Civil War.

Even so, local pride in the Scottish heritage of local pioneers remains very common in North Carolina. One of North America's largest Highland Games, the Grandfather Mountain Highland Games, are held there every year and draw in visitors from all over the world. The Grandfather Mountain games have been called "the best" such event in the United States because of the spectacular landscape and the large number of people who attend in kilts and other regalia of the Scottish clans. It is also widely considered to be the largest "gathering of clans" in North America, as more family lines are represented there than any other similar event.

References

Further reading
 Edited by Màiri Sìne Chaimbeul (2020), Iain mac Mhurchaidh: the Life and Work of John MacRae, Kintail and North Carolina, Scottish Gaelic Texts Society.
 Charles W. Dunn, "A North Carolina Gaelic Bard," North Carolina Historical Review 36 (October 1959).
 James MacKenzie, "The Odyssey of John MacRae," State magazine (Raleigh), (1 Dec. 1971).

External links
 Tha mi sgìth ‘n fhògar seo (I am weary of this exile) performed by Alasdair Whyte.
 NCpedia; MacRae, John

1780 deaths
18th-century American poets
18th-century Scottish Gaelic poets
American poetry in immigrant languages
Clan Macrae
Colonial American poets
Loyalists in the American Revolution from North Carolina
Loyalist military personnel of the American Revolutionary War
North Carolina folklore
People from Moore County, North Carolina
People from Ross and Cromarty
People of colonial North Carolina
Poets from North Carolina
Scottish-American culture in North Carolina
Scottish-American history
Scottish emigrants to the Thirteen Colonies
Scottish Gaelic diaspora poets
Songwriters from North Carolina
Writers from North Carolina